Bozzi is an Italian surname.

Notable people with this surname include:

 Aldo Bozzi (1909–1987), Italian lawyer and politician
 Emilio Bozzi, Italian businessman
 Giovanni Bozzi, Belgian basketball coach
 Giuseppe Maria Bozzi, Italian priest
 Julie Bozzi, American artist
 León Bozzi, Argentinian former sports shooter
 Marie-Jeanne Bozzi, French politician and criminal
 Mike Bozzi, American engineer
 Paolo Bozzi, Italian psychologist

See also
 Libreria Bozzi, Genoa, oldest bookshop in Italy

Surnames of Italian origin